Scorpion Bay Hot Sauce is a hot sauce company based in San Diego, California. The Scorpion Bay name comes from a surfing hotspot in Baja, Mexico.

History
Owner Rob Burns previously operated Roberto's Hot Sauce.

Production

Varieties
Scorpion Bay offers three sauces: Hotacado avocado hot sauce, De Arbol hot sauce and Chocopotle chipotle hot sauce.

References

External links
 Scorpion Bay Hot Sauce 
 Scorpion Bay Hot Sauce Interview

Manufacturing companies based in San Diego
Hot sauces
Condiment companies of the United States